Howard Stammler (July 23, 1911 – June 6, 1977) was an American professional basketball player. He played in the National Basketball League for the Dayton Metropolitans in four games during the 1937–38 season and averaged 5.0 points per game.

References

1911 births
1977 deaths
American men's basketball players
Basketball players from Ohio
Dayton Metropolitans players
Forwards (basketball)
Guards (basketball)
Ohio Wesleyan Battling Bishops men's basketball players